The Uttarakhand Human Rights Commission became fully functional in the true sense after appointment of Justice Vijender Jain, a former Chief Justice of Punjab and Haryana High Court who took charge as the first Chairperson on 13 May 2013. He was joined by Justice Rajesh Tandon, a former judge of Allahabad High Court & Uttarakhand High Court on 7 June 2013 as supporting member of the commission. The Secretary is Aparna Pandey

Functions
According to TPHRA, 1993 (with amendment act 2006), the commission is entitled to perform any of the following functions:

 Autonomously investigate on a petition filed by a victim or any person on his/her behalf as a complaint of
 Violation of human rights and instigation or
 Negligence in the prevention of such violations by any public servant.
 Get involved in any proceeding under allegation or violation of human rights pending before a court with the approval of that court.
 Inspect living conditions of the inmates in any jail or any other institution under the control of the State Government where persons are detained or lodged for purposes of treatment, reformation or protection.
 Review the safeguards provided in the constitution or any other law for the time it is in force to ensure the protection of human rights
 Review the factors that inhibit the enjoyment of human rights
 Undertake and promote research and awareness programs in the field of human rights
 Promote human rights awareness through literacy campaigns, publications, seminars etc. for the protection and safeguards available under human rights practices.
 Encourage involvement of Non-Government Organizations and individuals for expansion work in the field of human rights awareness.
 Perform any other functions that may be considered necessary for the promotion of human rights.
 
It is clarified that though the Commission has the power to inquire in violation of human rights (or instigation thereof) by a public servant. Instances where the human rights are violated by any individual citizen then the Commission can intervene, if there is failure or negligence on the part of a public servant to prevent any such violation.

References

Human rights in India
Human rights